Brigitte Roüan (born 28 September 1946) is a French director, screenwriter and actress.

Life and career
Rouan was born into a French naval family in Toulon in 1946. She was orphaned at age six and spent her childhood in Algeria and Senegal. At age 12, she left for convent school in Paris.

Her acting career began at age 21, on the stage. Her performance lead the way to small film roles for directors including Alain Resnais, Jacques Rivette, and Bertrand Tavernier.

Rouan became a director in her own right when she helmed a short film titled Grosse. It won a César Award in 1986. She would become a feature film director with Overseas (1990), which won the Critics' Week award at the 1990 Cannes Film Festival. She co-starred in the film with Marianne Basler and Nicole Garcia to portray sisters in colonial North Africa during the 1950s.

The now actor-director would continue in roles, including one in Olivier, Olivier (1991) for Polish director Agnieszka Holland.

Rouan's 1997 film Post Coitum, Animal Triste garnered attention for its depiction of an affair between a middle-aged woman (played by Rouan herself) and a younger man. The film was a success in its native country and received strong notices in America, where it screened at the New York Film Festival before playing to arthouse crowds. It was also screened in the Un Certain Regard section at the 1997 Cannes Film Festival.

In 1998, she was a member of the jury at the 48th Berlin International Film Festival.

Selected filmography

As director
 Overseas (1990)
 Post Coitum, Animal Triste (After Sex) (1997)
 Travaux, on sait quand ça commence... (Housewarming) (2005)
 "Tu honoreras ta mère et ta mère" (2012)

As actress
 Overseas (1990) as Malène
 Les Agneaux (1996)
 Post Coitum, Animal Triste (1997) as Diane Clovier
 Why Not Me? (1999) as Josepha
 Le Temps du Loup (Time of the Wolf) (2003) as Béa
 The Pleasure Is All Mine (2004) as Nicole
 Love Songs (2007) as Julie's Mother
 Spiral (TV series) (2008) as Karine Fontane 
 The Ultimate Accessory (2013)
 Demi-soeur (2013)
 Love at First Fight (2014)
 From the Land of the Moon (2016)
 Guy (2018)

References

External links
 "Post Release: Post-Coitum's Brigitte Rouan" by Brandon Judell, indieWIRE website, retrieved April 13, 2006
 

1946 births
20th-century French actresses
21st-century French actresses
French film actresses
French film directors
French stage actresses
French women film directors
Living people
Actors from Toulon
French women screenwriters
French screenwriters
Mass media people from Toulon